The IHF Women's Youth World Championship is the official competition for women's national handball teams under age 18. It has been organized by the International Handball Federation since 2006. It takes place every two years in even years.

Tournaments

Medal table

Participating nations

See also 
 Youth European Championship 
 Junior European Championship 
 Junior World Championship

References

External links
ihf.info

 
Women's handball competitions
Youth